Warren Christopher Paul-Roger Tchimbembé (born 21 April 1998) is a professional footballer who plays as a midfielder for  club Guingamp, on loan from Metz. Born in France, he represents Congo at international level.

Club career
On 22 May 2018, Tchimbembé signed his first professional contract with Troyes for three years. He made his professional debut with the club in a 2–1 Ligue 2 loss to Brest on 3 August 2018.

On 23 July 2020, Tchimbembé signed a four-year contract with Ligue 1 side Metz. On 28 January 2022, he signed for Segunda División club Mirandés on loan for the rest of the 2021–22 season. On 2 August 2022, Tchimbembé moved on loan to Guingamp, with an option to buy.

International career
Born in France, Tchimbembé is of Republic of the Congo descent. He debuted with the Congo national team in a 1–1 2022 FIFA World Cup qualification tie with Togo on 9 October 2021.

References

External links
 
 

1998 births
Living people
People from Gonesse
Republic of the Congo footballers
Republic of the Congo  international footballers
French footballers
French sportspeople of Republic of the Congo descent
Association football midfielders
ES Troyes AC players
FC Metz players
CD Mirandés footballers
En Avant Guingamp players
Ligue 1 players
Ligue 2 players
Championnat National 2 players
Championnat National 3 players
Segunda División players
French expatriate footballers
Republic of the Congo expatriate footballers
Expatriate footballers in Spain
French expatriate sportspeople in Spain
Republic of the Congo expatriate sportspeople in Spain
Footballers from Val-d'Oise